Anton Aleksandrovich Sakharov (born 20 October 1982, in Volgograd) is a former Russian footballer (defender). He last played in the Russian Second Division for FC Olimpia Volgograd. Sakharov played for Uralan Elista in the Russian Premier League during the 2003 season.

External links
 
 

1982 births
Living people
Russian footballers
Association football defenders
Russian Premier League players
Russian expatriate footballers
Expatriate footballers in Kazakhstan
Expatriate footballers in Belarus
Russian expatriate sportspeople in Kazakhstan
FC Olimpia Volgograd players
FC Energiya Volzhsky players
FC Elista players
FC Sokol Saratov players
FC Irtysh Pavlodar players
FC BATE Borisov players
FC Chernomorets Novorossiysk players
FC Orenburg players
FC SKA Rostov-on-Don players
Sportspeople from Volgograd